Nigella may refer to:

People

Nigella Lawson, English food writer
Nigella Saunders, Jamaican badminton player

Plants

Nigella, a genus of about 14 species of annual plants in the family Ranunculaceae, particularly
Nigella sativa, the seeds of which are used as a culinary spice 
Nigella damascena, (Love-in-a-mist), grown in gardens as an ornamental plant